Skenea is a genus of small to minute sea snails, marine gastropod mollusks in the family Skeneidae.

This genus is type genus for the family Skeneidae. It has been used as a general receptacle for species that are probably unrelated to the type species Helix serpuloides Montagu, 1808, such as Skenea divae Carrozza & Van Aartsen, 2001 and Skenea nilarum Engl, 1996.

Species
Species within the genus Skenea include:

 Skenea areolata (Sars, 1878)
 Skenea basicarinata Hoffman, Gofas & Freiwald, 2020
 Skenea basistriata (Jeffreys, 1877)
 Skenea californica (Bartsch, 1907)
 Skenea carmelensis Smith & Gordon, 1948
 Skenea catenoides (Monterosato, 1877)
 Skenea concordia (Bartsch, 1920)
 Skenea coronadoensis (Arnold, 1903)
 Skenea costulata Sbrana & Siracusa, 2018
 † Skenea crassa Lozouet, 1999 
 † Skenea dautzenbergi (Glibert, 1949) 
 Skenea diaphana (A. E. Verrill, 1884)
 Skenea divae Carrozza & van Aartsen, 2001
 Skenea ferruginea Warén, 1991
 Skenea giemellorum Romani, Bogi & Bartolini, 2015
 Skenea inclinans (Barnard, 1963)
 † Skenea indubitabilis Lozouet, 1999 
 Skenea larseni Warén, 1993
 † Skenea minuticostata Landau, Van Dingenen & Ceulemans, 2017 
 † Skenea multicostellata Lozouet, 1999 
 Skenea nilarum Engl, 1996
 Skenea olgae Segers, Swinnen & De Prins, 2009
 Skenea ossiansarsi Warén, 1991
 Skenea pelagia Nofroni & Valenti, 1987
 Skenea peterseni (Friele, 1877)
 Skenea polita Warén, 1993
 Skenea ponsonbyi (Dautzenberg & H. Fischer, 1897)
 Skenea profunda Friele, 1879
 Skenea proxima (Tryon, 1888)
 Skenea rugulosa (Sars, 1878)
 † Skenea saga Lozouet, 1999
 † Skenea sanctistephani Lozouet, 1999 
 Skenea serpuloides (Montagu, 1808)
 † Skenea subauriculata Lozouet, 1998 
 Skenea trochoides (Friele, 1876)
 Skenea turgida (Odhner, 1912)
 Skenea valvatoides (Jeffreys, 1883)
 Skenea victori Segers, Swinnen & De Prins, 2009
 † Skenea wareni Landau, Van Dingenen & Ceulemans, 2017 
  †Skenea wesselinghi D. F. Hoeksema & Simons, 2020 

Species brought into synonymy
 Skenea alderi Jeffreys, J.G., 1865: synonym of Dikoleps nitens (Philippi, 1844) 
 Skenea bujnitzkii (Gorbunov, 1946): synonym of Lissospira bujnitzkii (Gorbunov, 1946)
 Skenea cornuella A. Adams, 1860: synonym of Tubiola cornuella (A. Adams, 1860)
 Skenea cutleriana Clark, 1849: synonym of Dikoleps cutleriana (Clark, 1848)
 Skenea divisa Forbes & Hanley 1853: synonym of Skenea serpuloides (Montagu, 1808)
 Skenea exilissima (Philippi 1844): synonym of Skeneoides exilissima (Philippi 1844)
 Skenea forbesi Nordsieck 1982: synonym of Dikoleps nitens (Philippi, 1844) 
 Skenea gouldii Philippi, 1853: synonym of Skeneopsis planorbis (Fabricius, 1780) 
 Skenea helicina Monterosato 1874: synonym of Xenoskenea pellucida (Monterosato 1874)
 Skenea hyalina Jeffreys, 1867: synonym of Skeneopsis planorbis (Fabricius, 1780) 
 Skenea laevigata Jeffreys, 1876: synonym of Skenea trochoides (Friele, 1876)
 Skenea laevis Forbes & Hanley 1856: synonym of Dikoleps nitens (Philippi 1844)
 Skenea liratus A. E. Verrill, 1882: synonym of Circulus liratus (A. E. Verrill, 1882) 
 Skenea maculata Jeffreys, 1867: synonym of Skeneopsis planorbis (Fabricius, 1780) 
 Skenea mutabilis Costa, O.G., 1861: synonym of Dikoleps nitens (Philippi, 1844) 
 Skenea nitens (Philippi, 1844): synonym of Dikoleps pusilla (Jeffreys, 1847)
 Skenea nitidissima Forbes & Hanley 1853: synonym of Omalogyra atomus (Philippi 1841)
 Skenea pellucida Monterosato 1874: synonym of Xenoskenea pellucida (Monterosato 1874)
 Skenea pellucidoides Nordsieck 1982: synonym of Xenoskenea pellucida (Monterosato 1874)
 Skenea petitii P. Fischer, 1857: synonym of Solariorbis petitii (P. Fischer, 1857)
 Skenea planorbis Fabricius, 1780: synonym of Skeneopsis planorbis (Fabricius, 1780) 
 Skenea rota Forbes & Hanley, 1850: synonym of Ammonicera rota (Forbes & Hanley, 1850)
 Skenea serpuloides auct. non Montagu, 1808: synonym of Skeneopsis planorbis (Fabricius, 1780) 
 Skenea subcanaliculata E.A. Smith, 1875: synonym of Microdiscula subcanaliculata (E.A. Smith, 1875)
 Skenea sulcata Simpson, 1887: synonym of Cyclostremiscus beauii (P. Fischer, 1857)
 Skenea tricarinata Webster, 1856: synonym of Ammonicera rota (Forbes & Hanley, 1850)  
 Skenea trilix Bush, 1885: synonym of Cyclostremiscus trilix (Bush, 1885)
 Skenea trochiformis Jeffreys, 1867: synonym of Skeneopsis planorbis (Fabricius, 1780)

References

 Vaught, K.C. (1989). A classification of the living Mollusca. American Malacologists: Melbourne, FL (USA). . XII, 195 pp.
 Gofas, S.; Le Renard, J.; Bouchet, P. (2001). Mollusca, in: Costello, M.J. et al. (Ed.) (2001). European register of marine species: a check-list of the marine species in Europe and a bibliography of guides to their identification. Collection Patrimoines Naturels, 50: pp. 180–213

External links
 Fleming J. 1825. On the British testaceous annelids. The Edinburgh Philosophical Journal, 12(24): 238-248
 Gray J.E. (1847). A list of the genera of recent mollusca, their synonyma and types. Proceedings of the Zoological Society of London. 15: 129-219
 Tom Iredale, Some more misused molluscan generic names : Skenea; Journal of Molluscan Studies, 11:5, pp. 291-306; April 1915

 
Skeneidae
Gastropod genera